King Size Dick (born Heinz Ganss; December 29, 1942) in Cologne is a German Rock music singer, who mainly sings in the Colognian dialect.

Biography 
King Size Dick, a truck driver by profession, began his musical career in the 1960s in his home town of Cologne in several smaller musical bands. The first band he was a member of was called "Dick & The Shade". Whilst serving in the armed forces in Wales, he was a guest singer in a band called Brian Poole & The Tremeloes.

In the 1970s, he performed together with the Bläck Fööss, whilst also working as their truck driver. He usually took on the role of singing the band's successful song "Linda Lou", which has since been inextricably associated with the name King Size Dick.

At the end of the 1970s, he joined the "Formation Dick & Alex", together with guitarist and songwriter Alex Parche. They played German rock music songs such as Schweine in weißen Westen (which translates to 'pigs in white vests').

Awards
King Size Dick is the bearer of the 2002 Willi Ostermann medal, the highest official award of the Cologne Carnival.

Origin of stage name
While Ganss was stationed in Wales with the German armed forces, he was asked to perform locally at social events, such as birthdays, which were potluck. In Cologne, overweight people are at times given the nickname Dick, from the German adjective which means 'fat'. Another example of the use of the German adjective as a nickname is for the comedy duo of Laurel and Hardy, which Germans often refer to as "Dick und Doof", meaning 'fat and stupid'. Thus the adjective dick became a nickname for Ganss. During one of the social gatherings in Wales, someone asked Heinz Ganss his name. He replied "Dick", referring to the German adjective for 'fat', or 'large', or 'bigger'. The person who asked him presumed that this was a German word and asked what the German word "dick" meant in English. Heinz Ganss replied: "large". "Oh", replied the Welshman and paraphrased: "king size". Ganss stuck to that and thus his stage name remained "King Size Dick" ('big and fat'), with no intended phallic connotation. Back home, his nickname and stage name remained "Dick", even in the Colognian dialect.

Discography (incomplete)

Albums
  (1979)
  (1981)
  (1990)
  (1991)
  (1993)
 Kölsche Spezialitäten  (1995)
  (1996)
  (2003)
 Weihnacht (2009)

Singles
 Macho-girl (1990)
 Wapapapa u.a. (1991)
 Kölle my love (1995)
 Halleluja (1995)
  (1997)
  (1997)
  (1998)
  (2001)
 Kölsche Evergreens (2007)
  (2010)

References

External links 
 King Size Dick – official Website
 King Size Dick at Musicline.de
 
 Agentur Ahrens - Profile of King Size Dick from his Agent
 Diabetes Advice from King Size Dick
 Musical Video Clips featuring King Size Dick

German rock musicians
German comedy musicians
Musicians from Cologne
1942 births
Living people